Tongjing Wan is a brownish-black pill used in Traditional Chinese medicine to "promote blood flow, dispel cold, regulate menstruation and relieve pain". It tastes slightly sweet and bitter. It is used where there is "abdominal pain during menstruation due to stagnation of blood by cold ". Tongjing Wan is to be taken before menstruation.

Chinese classic herbal formula

See also
 Chinese classic herbal formula
 Bu Zhong Yi Qi Wan

References

Traditional Chinese medicine pills